The Sisters of St. Mary of Oregon (abbreviated SSMO), formerly known as the Sisters of the Most Precious Blood, is a Catholic religious congregation founded in 1886 in the U.S. state of Oregon. The sisters' convent is located in Beaverton and they are independent from the Archdiocese of Portland.

The Sisters provide lifelong learning opportunities through programs and speaker series. Their sponsored ministries include Valley Catholic School and Maryville Care. The Sisters of St. Mary of Oregon Ministries Corporation and the Sisters of St. Mary of Oregon Foundation provide administrative and developmental support to the sponsored ministries.

History

Founding 
In 1843 the Missionaries of the Precious Blood migrated from Germany to the United States, settling in Ohio. They were soon joined by the Sisters of the Precious Blood. In 1866, a dispute occurred within the Precious Blood community. As a result, Father Joseph Albrecht (along with a group of parishioners, Sisters, and Brothers), left the community. The group traveled to Minnesota, then (following Father Albrecht's death) to Jordan, Oregon. By 1885 members of this schismatic religious colony began to question the decisions of the new leadership. As a result, nine women left the community and were invited to stay with the Benedictines of Mount Angel Abbey. Archbishop William Hickley Gross visited the colony and laid out a plan for reconciliation with the Catholic Church. The group's elders rejected the plan, but the women asked to come along with the bishop, who wanted them to become a formal religious community. After several months of living with the Catholic institute of the Benedictine Sisters of Mt. Angel at the Queen of Angels Monastery, the Sisters refounded their order, moved to Sublimity, and began their new life as the Sisters of the Most Precious Blood. They changed their name to Sisters of St. Mary of Oregon in 1905.

On March 25, 1887, five of the Sisters made their first Profession of Vows: Theresa Arnold, Emma Bleily, Cecilia Boedigheimer, Josephine Eifert, and Clara Hauck. Emma Bleily took the name Wilhelmina in honor of Archbishop William Gross. She was elected as the first Mother General of the community at the age of 29, and became known as Mother Wilhelmina Bleily. Mother Wilhelmina is known as one of the nine Foundresses of the community.

St. Mary's Orphanage 
In 1889, Archbishop Gross approved construction of St. Mary's Orphanage in Beaverton, Oregon and asked the Sisters to staff it. By June 1891, three Sisters were serving in Sublimity, three were serving in Verboort, Oregon, and all of the other Sisters had moved to Beaverton. The Sisters lived at the orphanage where they cared for sixty children, tended to the building, and harvested crops.

Mother Seraphim Theisen the community's second Mother General, built a home nearby which became the community's first Motherhouse. On January 18, 1894, Archbishop Gross dedicated the Motherhouse to Our Lady of Perpetual Help.

Presently, the Sisters reside in a new Motherhouse, across the street from the original building. The orphanage was run by the Sisters until June 16, 1953. It is now run by the state of Oregon and has been renamed to St. Mary's Home for Boys.

Early twentieth century 
In 1901, under Mother Theresa Heuberger, the Community adopted English as its official language (up until this point the community had used German as its primary language).

In January 1903, the Sisters opened a boarding school on their campus which served both boys and girls: St. Mary's Academy.

On August 12, 1905, Archbishop Alexander Christie asked the Sisters to approve three significant changes:

 He requested that they rename their boarding school so that it would not be confused with St. Mary's Academy in downtown Portland. The boarding school became St. Mary's Institute.
 Since there was another Precious Blood community in Portland, he requested they change the name of their community as well. They became the Sisters of St. Mary of Oregon.
 As Sisters of the Precious Blood, they had worn red cinctures (belts). With their new name change, the Archbishop asked them to wear black cintures instead. They agreed.

The Sisters expanded their complex, adding both an east and west wing to the Motherhouse (in 1902 and 1905 respectively), and purchasing nearby property. In 1930, the Sisters began construction on the nearby property, constructing what is now their present Motherhouse. The first phase of the Motherhouse included the main building and west wing. The Sister took up residence there on September 22, 1930. It was another six years before their chapel was complete. It was dedicated to Our Lady of Perpetual Help on March 19, 1936. It would be more than a decade before the west wing would be added in the early 1950s.

References

Further reading
 Schoenberg, Wilfred P., S. J. These Valiant Women: History of the Sisters of St. Mary of Oregon 1886-1986. Portland, Oregon: Western Lithograph, 1986.

External links
 
 

German-American culture in Oregon
Catholic Church in Oregon
Catholic female orders and societies
Beaverton, Oregon
Religious organizations established in 1886
Catholic religious institutes established in the 19th century
Swiss-American history
1886 establishments in Oregon